"Long, Slow Kisses" is a song recorded by American country music artist Jeff Bates. It was first included on his 2003 debut album Rainbow Man. Bates re-recorded the song in 2004 and released it as the first single from his second album, Leave the Light On. He co-wrote the song with Gordon Bradberry and Ben Hayslip.

Critical reception
In his review of the album, Stephen Thomas Erlewine of Allmusic wrote that the song "stumbles in its attempts at seduction." Robert Loy of Country Standard Time was more positive, saying that "for such a young man, he certainly sounds as if he knows of whence he sings."

Chart performance
"Long, Slow Kisses" debuted at number 56 on the U.S. Billboard Hot Country Singles & Tracks chart for the week of September 25, 2004.

Year-end charts

References

2004 singles
Jeff Bates songs
RCA Records Nashville singles
Songs written by Ben Hayslip
Song recordings produced by David Malloy
Song recordings produced by Blake Chancey
Songs written by Jeff Bates
2004 songs